John Henry Monger Snr (1802–1867) arrived in Western Australia as an assisted migrant in 1829. After a short period running a mill at what became Lake Monger, he established a hotel and store in York and went on to become one of the richest men in the colony.

Early years in England 
Monger was born on 2 February 1802 in Faversham, Kent, England.  By trade he was an engineer.

First years in Western Australia
He arrived on 6 October 1829 on board Lotus with his wife Mary. Monger was to be foreman of Latour's sawmills.

Monger constructed and ran a sawmill at a lake just north of the Perth settlement, a lake which later came to bear his name, Lake Monger. He and his wife at first had a camp there but then built a house.

A Mr Halliday "met his death by violence" near the Lake and Monger and at first "natives" and then a sawyer called John Ellis (a "timid man") were suspected of the shooting.  Monger (who was accustomed to conversing with the natives – "he understood a few of their words, and the rest were made intelligible to him by signs") gave evidence.  The matter remained a "mistery".

Yagan, Yellagonga and other Noongar warriors chose the Lake as a place to assemble. "The Natives have become so troublesome to Mr Monger, that he has this morning applied for a sufficient military force to repel them.  Their numbers in the neighbourhood of the Lake have greatly increased, by accession from other tribes, all larger and more powerful men than those we have been accustomed to see.  Mr Monger informed us, he can only recognise three of the party, out of about forty men, as those who have been in the habit of resorting to that quarter. They have now he says taken such full possession of his place that unless they are repulsed, he must abandon it". Monger left the Lake in March 1833.

Monger is reported to have carried a gallon of brandy around the colony for sale and he sold it for a price that enabled him next time to buy double the amount of brandy.  In November 1833, Monger took possession of the Perth Hotel (the "old established hotel" offering "dinners, beds and stabling") and he published an advertisement soliciting the support of the public.

Monger also took up a grant of land on Mount Eliza on which he built a house with four rooms (Perth Lot L55). Monger put the Lake Monger property up for lease or sale in September 1834 and again in April and October 1836, also putting two Mount Eliza lots up for sale including his pit and cross-cut saws, with the statement "proprietor moving to York".

On 21 May 1836, Monger's banker, William Lamb, put up for auction his house at Mt Eliza (Perth Lot L55) pus "200 acres of LAND situate on one of the Lakes at the back of Perth".

In May 1836, Monger wrote a letter to the paper criticising his banker for calling up a mortgage of £25.  The rate of interest was 25% p.a.  Monger complained that he had been paying the interest monthly. He claimed he was at risk of losing his house and land at the Lakes except for the kindness of a few friends.  The banker responded that he had warned Monger that the principal sum would be required when it was due but instead of repaying the loan, Monger went to York for three weeks.

York
Monger initially walked to York.  While everyone else was wanting a grant of farmland for sheep grazing, Monger saw an opportunity to open a hotel and store. Monger decided that the best location for a hotel and store was close to the ford across the Avon River at York.

The land he chose (Suburban Lots A1 and A2) had been claimed by Rivett Henry Bland and Arthur Trimmer. Trimmer also had a house next to Bland's and there was also a barn. Monger bought this land for £100. At the time, Bland was the Government resident magistrate for York and Beverley.

Monger’s store and the York Hotel 

Monger applied for a free licence in early 1837 and then an ordinary licence.  He was described as being "a publican, of York" on 5 February 1837, when he had to personally eject a troublesome private in the 21st Regiment named John Curran (Curran being later charged with assault in hitting Monger with a bludgeon).
The original hotel was a small building of wattle and daub and was the first hotel in the area.  This was called The York Hotel. The wattle and daub hotel burnt down and Monger then built a large and substantial hostelry.

It was a dangerous time, in July 1838, Monger returned to Perth to report spearings by "hostile tribes".  On 20 May 1839, the wife of Elijah Cook was murdered by aboriginals not far to the south of York, which caused shock waves throughout the Colony.

In December 1838, Monger ("innkeeper of York") was charged with assaulting James Manson in the street in Perth, but the case was "compromised by paying the constable’s expenses equally".  In 1838, Monger's licence fee was doubled from 5 pounds to 10 pounds.  He asked for the additional fee to be suspended, complaining that in a distant place like York, the remuneration from accommodation is limited and precarious, and that his crops had failed and he had lost some good friends to his business.

In May 1840, the Government expressed a desire to extend Avon Terrace through Monger's land.  Monger sought compensation and after much haggling, was granted Town Lot 1 as a replacement.

A few months after this, he opened Monger's Store, commonly referred to as "Monger's".  It was the first general store established in York. Stocks such as hardware, drapery, groceries, wines and spirits, provisions and implements were sold there.  Monger advertised his goods heavily from 4 August 1841 onwards, as being available "at the stores of the undersigned".

Monger became unpopular because in October 1840, he declined to provide a dinner "according to promise" for the first Fair of the York Agricultural Society.  Settler Dr Samuel Viveash commented in his diary entry of 22 December 1840: "Called on Monger, he was not inclined to settle my bill, indeed tried to snatch it out of my hand."

Monger's "store" was on the opposite side of Avon Terrace, and was a "long, low building", and "every three months his wagons would journey to Guildford or Perth for supplies". The stone section on the south east corner of what is now called the sandalwood yards could have been this "long low building".  

In 1841, Monger built a windmill.   The windmill was located on two acres on the north east corner, where the current sandalwood yards are located.

Monger also built a blacksmith's shop on Town Lot 1 and engaged a blacksmith, but at the time he did not have a grant of the land and so he had to seek the Governor's permission to occupy his own building.  He also applied for permission to occupy an island to the north of the ford as a summer hotel but the Governor refused this request.

In November 1842, he advertised for "a steady, industrious man to take charge of and drive a team of bullocks, and otherwise make himself generally useful".
Monger's mill appears not to have worked consistently as in a number of 1843 advertisements, Monger offered for sale "an excellent flour mill, now in good operation". One advantage of having a mill was that Monger could accept wheat after harvest instead of cash in payment for goods sold.  At the time, "money is not to be had in the Colony, all is barter".

In May 1844, Monger gave technical assistance to Walkinshaw Cowan in his steam mill venture in Guildford, and was also an investor. In his diary, Cowan blamed the failure of the venture on "the misconduct and ignorance of an Engineer".

In November 1844, Monger advertised his hotel ("The York Hotel") to be let for "one year to seven, as may be agreed on".  The ad sets out a full description of the property.

Monger was trying to find a buyer for the business "so that he could concentrate on his merchandising business".  "This included expanding his interests and also establishing himself as a collecting agent for Western Australia’s burgeoning sandalwood industry".

It appears that Monger did not find a tenant for the hotel because he continued to trade the hotel and advertise.  Monger also continued offering goods for sale at his "stores".

Sandalwood
Around this time, sandalwood was starting to be exported from the York region by Messrs Carter and T Ellis. Licensing for the cutting of sandalwood had been in force since 1841.  Ellis was a tenant of Monger, living in a small house on Town Lot 1. 
The sandalwood was exported to Singapore and China.

York farmers brought their sandalwood to Monger's and, in exchange, would receive goods and articles from the store. In addition to dealing in sandalwood, Monger was heavily involved in buying, selling, storing and carting wool.  He recognised the value of fencing as this eliminated the need for shepherds, and he imported large quantities of fencing wire.

In 1847, Monger obtained his first sandalwood licences, enabling him to have two teams of two men to gather sandalwood for three months, and Monger became one of the exporters.  
In that year, 1847, the amount of sandalwood exported from Western Australia multiplied tenfold to  earning £4,440, almost as much as the wool exports from the Colony. In the following year, 1848, sandalwood exports tripled again and brought in £13,353 and wool exports were £15,098, a fair proportion of which would have been to Monger.

Eliza Brown refers to Monger in one of her letters to her father, William Bussey, in England:

Faversham House
Monger built a new home called Faversham House after the place in Kent where John Henry Monger Snr had been born.
There is a reference to Monger's "hospitable mansion" in January 1852.

In 1853, Monger was the designer of the Wesleyan Chapel, immediately to the south of Faversham House, and builder.  His specifications show his attention to detail.

Later life
Monger allowed Samuel Smale Craig to run the York Hotel and on 8 May 1852, Craig was granted a liquor licence for the hotel under the name Agricultural and Commercial Hotel. Then in August 1853, Monger advertised that the York Hotel was available for lease.  Monger had had sold land to Craig on the corner of Avon Tce and South Street on which Craig was to construct the Castle Hotel.

In August 1853, Monger permitted R A Bennett to re-commence trading at the York Hotel.  To help Bennett set up the hotel, Monger found some things in his cellar (this must have been the cellar at Faversham House) and gave them to Bennett.  According to Bennett, these objects included two bullock's horns. A year later, Monger claimed that Bennett had stolen the two bullock's horns, and a number of other objects including 3 boards, screws and nails, a button, a pick and some tobacco.  Monger pressed criminal charges against Bennett.  Bennett successfully defended these charges and then sued Monger for £2,000 damages for malicious and vexatious prosecution for felony.  Bennett was successful and recovered £40 damages (being the costs he had spent defending the criminal charges).  Monger appealed and lost.

Monger's son, Joseph T Monger took over the running of the York Hotel.

In May 1853, John Henry Monger Snr paid for and built a "temporary" bridge at Monger's Crossing or Monger's Ford.

The following year, Monger attempted to subdivide and put up for sale 16 half acre allotments, 9 on the river front and another 7 on the other side running towards Faversham, presumably not including his store.   He offered these lots for auction on 15 October 1854.  The ads describe the property fully.  Not a single lot was sold.

On 1 November 1854, "the gentry and public generally of York and surrounding districts" were invited to the re-opening of the "York Hotel" by G.J. Blackiston who has "refurnished and stocked it with a choice selection of wines, spirits, bottled and draft ales, etc".  
In 1855, Monger added a steam engine to his mill.

On 10 October 1856, Monger advertised that he was going to England on a temporary visit and all parties who owed him money should pay their bills or the matter would be put in the hands of his solicitors.

In April 1857, Monger "enlivened the dullness of York by erecting a bell at his house, upon which is struck with considerable regularity, the hours, day and night".

In June 1857, Joseph T Monger took over his father's businesses in York and advertised "that he has on sale at his Wholesale and Retail Stores in York, an extensive and varied Stock of the undermentioned articles".  He also announced that wheat will be ground and dressed at Monger's new steam mill, York.

In March 1858, Monger and his daughter went on a trip to England.  He returned by the Dolphin in 1859. 
An 1849 Map of York by P. L. S. Chauncy shows the extent of Monger's holdings in the immediate vicinity of York. Monger owned 78 1/2 acres south of the main settlement and also owned land to the north, which included Avon Locations A1 and A2.

In 1853, Monger held 30,000 acres of farmland in the York district. 

Monger took advantage of the availability of ticket-of-leave men and employed 63 of them between 1852 and 1871. 

Towards the end of his life, York people called Monger the "Duke" (of York).

Monger had a reputation for financially supporting many pastoralists.  He gave financial assistance to William Marwick when he was in financial difficulties.

In 1858, Monger's wealth was so well known that he issued "One Pound Notes".

Monger gave land for a town hall at York in 1861.
He owned a grand home towards the top of St George's Tce in Perth.

Death
John Henry Monger died on 12 November 1867.  No obituary was published for him.

At the time, he held  of land, and this was one of the "first great estates to be broken up".

In his will, he left Faversham and the other property to the west of Avon Terrace (except the mill) to John Henry Monger Jnr, the property to the east of Avon Terrace (and the mill and store) to Joseph Taylor Monger, his St George's Terrace property to his daughter and what is now 156 Avon Terrace, York and some farm land to George.

Legacy

In an 1889 interview with early settler and farmer John Taylor, who came to the York district in 1841 where the only storekeeper was Monger, Taylor said:

Janet Millett, who lived in York in the 1860s, commented at p 393 of An Australian Parsonage:

Extended family
Monger's younger brother Stephen John Monger, born on 21 June 1806 in Faversham, Kent, emigrated to Western Australia in 1844.  John Henry Monger Sr applied to purchase a block for him in Northam so he could set himself up with a store and hotel.  Stephen and his family ran businesses in Northam and Toodyay.

Notes

References

Settlers of Western Australia
Australian businesspeople
1867 deaths
People from York, Western Australia